Lerista wilkinsi, also known commonly as the two-toed fine-lined slider and Wilkins' lerista,  is a species of skink, a lizard in the family Scincidae. The species is endemic to Queensland in Australia.

Etymology
The specific name, wilkinsi, is in honour of Australian explorer George Hubert Wilkins.

Habitat
The preferred natural habitats of L. wilkinsi are forest and savanna.

Reproduction
Lerista wilkinsi is oviparous.

References

Further reading
Cogger HG (2014). Reptiles and Amphibians of Australia, Seventh Edition. Clayton, Victoria, Australia: CSIRO Publishing. xxx + 1,033 pp. .
Greer AE (1967). "A new generic arrangement for some Australian scincid lizards". Breviora (267): 1–19. (Lerista wilkinsi, new combination, p. 19).
Parker HW (1926). "New Reptiles and a new Frog from Queensland". Annals and Magazine of Natural History, Ninth Series 17: 665–670. (Lygosoma wilkinsi, new species, p. 667).
Smith MA (1937). "A review of the genus Lygosoma (Scincidae: Reptilia) and its allies". Records of the Indian Museum 39 (3): 213–234. (Rhodona wilkinsi, new combination, p. 230).
Wilson S, Swan G (2013). A Complete Guide to Reptiles of Australia, Fourth Edition. Sydney: New Holland Publishers. 522 pp. .

Lerista
Reptiles described in 1926
Taxa named by Hampton Wildman Parker